Sarah Douglass may refer to:

 Sarah Mapps Douglass (1806–1882), American educator, abolitionist, writer, and public lecturer
 Sarah Hallam Douglass (died 1773), English-born American stage actress and theatre director

See also
 Sarah Douglas (disambiguation)